La Fórmula is the first studio album by Pina Records' super-group La Fórmula featuring Zion & Lennox, Plan B, RKM & Ken-Y, Arcángel (debut with Pina Records), Lobo & Jalil Lopez. It was released on August 21, 2012 competing with Ivy Queen's Musa released the same day. It debuted at No. 1 on the Billboard Top Latin Albums chart. It featured collaborations with Daddy Yankee, Yomo, Jory, Don Omar, De La Ghetto, and Randy. It received a nomination for the Billboard Latin Music Award for Latin Rhythm Album of the Year in 2013 and 2014.

Track listing 
Standard edition

Promotional songs 
 Te Dijeron – Plan B
 3 Pa' 3 – Maldy, Rakim, Lennox
 Cuando Te Enamores – Rakim & Ken-Y
 Gastos Largos – Arcángel
 Cantazo – Zion & Lennox featuring Yomo
 Chupop – Zion & Lennox
 Me Prefieres A Mí (Remix) – Arcángel featuring Don Omar
 Diosa De Los Corazones – Ken-Y, Zion, Lobo, Lennox, Arcángel, Rakim
 Juego Mental – Lobo

Music videos 
 "Te Dijeron" – Plan B
 "Cuando Te Enamores" – Rakim & Ken-Y
 "Flow Violento" – Arcángel
 "La Fórmula Sigue" – Zion, Arcángel, Lennox, Rakim, Chencho, Maldy, Ken-Y
 "Diosa De Los Corazones" – Ken-Y, Zion, Lobo, Lennox, Arcángel, Rakim
 "More" – Jory, Zion, Ken-Y
 "Ella Me Dice" – Zion, Arcángel

Remixes 
 Chupop – Zion & Lennox featuring Lui-G 21+, Franco El Gorila, J Álvarez, Ñengo Flow, Ñejo
 Te Dijeron – Plan B featuring Don Omar, Natti Natasha, Syko
 Cuando Te Enamores – Rakim & Ken-Y featuring J Álvarez
 More – Jory, Zion, Ken-Y, Chencho, Arcángel
 Flow Violento – Arcángel featuring De La Ghetto

Charts

References 

2012 compilation albums
Latin pop compilation albums
Reggaeton compilation albums
Spanish-language compilation albums
Pina Records compilation albums
R.K.M & Ken-Y albums
Arcángel (singer) albums
Plan B (duo) albums
Zion & Lennox albums
Albums produced by Luny Tunes
Albums produced by Rafy Mercenario